Blanche Satchel was an Australian dancer and model.

Biography
Satchel appeared in the Ziegfeld Follies and Earl Carroll's Vanities and was once Miss Australia. She came from London, England, with the Follies in 1925. Her height was 5'7", she weighed 123 pounds, and she had brown eyes. Her mother was an actress. She was linked romantically to aviator Charles Lindbergh according to newspaper stories in 1928.

Satchel was the subject of a number of nude paintings rendered by Howard Chandler Christy, who is famous for the Christy Girl. She is noted for posing for a portrait of Juliet which was presented to the Shakespeare Foundation. She also modeled for a series of murals which were displayed in an elegant hotel in Buffalo, New York. Christy once described her as "the most beautiful Titian-blonde in the world". In 1927 Satchel posed for a Lucky Strike cigarette advertisement with fellow Ziegfeld Girls Murrell Finley, Myrna Darby and Jean Ackerman.

Personal life
She was the second wife of millionaire broker Max Bamberger. They wed in Greenwich, Connecticut on 20 June 1933. Satchel was awarded a divorce on a cruelty charge in September 1938. She died in New York in 2004.

References

Sources
 Elyria Chronicle Telegram, "Rumor Lindy Is Interested In Show Girl", 27 September 1928, pg. 2.
 Fresno Bee, "Lindy Interested In Follies Beauty Broadway (Manhattan) Hears", 27 September 1928, pg. 1.
 Galveston Daily News, 21 September 1927, pg. 4.
 Lowell Sun, Dorothy Kilgallen, Friday, 13 March 1942, pg. 33.
 Nevada State Journal, "Follies Dancer, Model Obtains Divorce", 8 September 1938, pg 3.
 Syracuse Herald, "Lindy Reported Wooing Girl of Earl Carroll Vanities", 27 September 1928, pg 1.
 Syracuse Herald, "Looks To His Models", 23 February 1929, pg. 55.

External links

Profile, streetswing.com; accessed 11 March 2017.
News index on Satchel, trove.nla.gov.au; accessed 11 March 2017.

Australian female dancers
Australian female models
Ziegfeld girls
Place of birth unknown
Place of death unknown
Year of birth unknown
Year of death unknown